

Events

 Yishan Yining is sent on a diplomatic mission to Japan to restore relations with the Bakufu government

Births

Deaths

13th-century poetry
Poetry